The 2021 Chattanooga Mocs football team represented the University of Tennessee at Chattanooga in the 2021 NCAA Division I FCS football season as a member of the Southern Conference (SoCon). The Mocs were led by second-year head coach Rusty Wright and played their home games at Finley Stadium in Chattanooga, Tennessee.

Schedule

References

Chattanooga
Chattanooga Mocs football seasons
Chattanooga Mocs football